Becky Ann Baker (née Gelke; born February 17, 1953) is an American actress. She is best known for her roles of Jean Weir on NBC comedy-drama series Freaks and Geeks (1999–2000) and Loreen Horvath on HBO comedy-drama series Girls (2012–2017), the latter of which earned two Critics' Choice Television Award nominations and a Primetime Emmy Award nomination.

Baker's film credits include Jacob's Ladder (1990), In & Out (1997), A Simple Plan (1998), Stay (2005), Nights in Rodanthe (2008), Hope Springs (2012), Table 19 (2017), The Half of It (2020), and Holler (2020).

Early life 
Becky Ann Gelke was born in Fort Knox, Kentucky, the daughter of a military officer. She graduated from West Springfield High School in Springfield, Virginia and Western Kentucky University.

Career
Baker's film credits include Blue Steel, Jacob's Ladder, Lorenzo's Oil, Unstrung Heroes, Sabrina, Ridley Scott's White Squall, Men in Black, In & Out, Woody Allen's Celebrity, Sam Raimi's A Simple Plan (for which she received a Blockbuster Entertainment Award nomination), Two Weeks Notice, Steven Spielberg's War of the Worlds, Stay, The Night Listener, Death of a President, and Spider-Man 3.

She got her role in Freaks and Geeks after series creator Paul Feig and Judd Apatow saw her performance in Sam Raimi's A Simple Plan. "That really informed their decision to try to use me from having really no huge television experience," she said. In addition to Freaks and Geeks, her television credits include Stephen King's Storm of the Century and guest spots on L.A. Law, Frasier, Star Trek: Voyager, Sex & the City, Law & Order: Special Victims Unit, Oz and All My Children.

An accomplished stage performer, Baker made her Broadway debut in the 1981 production of The Best Little Whorehouse in Texas, and received a Drama-Logue Award in 1994 for her work in Night and Her Stars. She is a founding member of New York-based theatre company The Drama Dept.

In 2009, she appeared in the NBC series Kings, playing the minor role of Jessie Shepherd, mother of protagonist David Shepherd.  Her real-life husband, Dylan Baker, played antagonist William Cross in the series.

Personal life
Baker has been married to actor Dylan Baker since 1990. They have a daughter.

Filmography

Film

Television

Theatre credits

References

External links 
 

1953 births
20th-century American actresses
21st-century American actresses
Actresses from Kentucky
American film actresses
American musical theatre actresses
American stage actresses
American television actresses
Living people